Women's 5000m races for class T54 wheelchair athletes at the 2004 Summer Paralympics were held in the Athens Olympic Stadium on 19 and 21 September. The event consisted of 2 heats and a final, and was won by Wakako Tsuchida, representing .

1st round

Heat 1
19 Sept. 2004, 21:15

Heat 2
19 Sept. 2004, 21:35

Final round

21 Sept. 2004, 18:35

References

W
2004 in women's athletics